Kızılalan is a village in Mut district of Mersin Province, Turkey.

References

Villages in Mut District